Kevin Rutland (born April 2, 1988) is an American football cornerback who is currently a free agent. He was signed by the Jacksonville Jaguars as an undrafted free agent in 2011. He played college football at Missouri.

Professional career

Jacksonville Jaguars
Rutland was signed as an undrafted free agent in 2011. He was released by the Jaguars on October 15, 2012 and re-signed on October 26.

He was waived/injured on August 30, 2013, and waived on September 6.

Kansas City Chiefs
Rutland signed with the Chiefs on January 1, 2014.  The Chiefs waived Rutland on August 26, 2014.

Toronto Argonauts
On October 8, 2015, Rutland was signed to the practice roster of the Toronto Argonauts of the Canadian Football League. He was released by the Argonauts on November 16, 2015.

References

External links
Toronto Argonauts bio
Jacksonville Jaguars bio

1988 births
Living people
American football cornerbacks
Canadian football defensive backs
American players of Canadian football
Missouri Tigers football players
Jacksonville Jaguars players
Kansas City Chiefs players
Toronto Argonauts players
Players of American football from Houston
Players of Canadian football from Houston